Julie Robin Gore (born 5 August 1958) is a former Welsh professional female darts player.

Career

Gore made her World Championship in 2008, losing in the quarter finals to Trina Gulliver. She later reached the semi finals of the Women's Winmau World Masters, beating Irina Armstrong in the quarter finals before losing to another Russian Anastasia Dobromyslova.

Gore originally entered the 2009 World Championship as the number 4 seed, but following Dobromyslova's defection to the Professional Darts Corporation she was moved up to the number 3 seed.  She was drawn against standby qualifier Rilana Erades of The Netherlands in the quarter finals and lost 2–1.

In October 2010 she won her biggest title at the Winmau World Masters beating Francis Hoenselaar 4–1 and repeated the feat in October 2012, defeating Deta Hedman by a scoreline of 4–1 in the final.

Julie qualified for the 2013 BDO World Darts Championship and made it through to the quarter-finals for the 6th year running but was beaten 0–2 by Trina Gulliver.

2017
Since 2017 she has not participated in any darts event.

World Professional results

BDO

 2008: Quarter Finals (lost Trina Gulliver 1–2) (sets) 
 2009: Quarter Finals (lost Rilana Erades 1–2)
 2010: Quarter Finals (lost Rhian Edwards 0–2)
 2011: Quarter Finals (lost Rhian Edwards 1–2)
 2012: Quarter Finals (lost Anastasia Dobromyslova 0–2)
 2013: Quarter Finals (lost Trina Gulliver 0–2)
 2014: Quarter Finals (lost Ann-Louise Peters 0–2)

External links
Profile and stats on Darts Database

Living people
Welsh darts players
1958 births
Female darts players
British Darts Organisation players
Sportspeople from Cardiff
Sportspeople from Llanelli